Hengyang Bajialing Airport is a former military and civil airport in the city of Hengyang in Hunan Province, China.  It is located in Zhuhui District east of the Xiang River.  Bajialing Airport has not served commercial flights since 1995, and the new Hengyang Nanyue Airport was opened in December 2014 to serve as Hengyang's civil airport.

History
The airport was built in September 1929.  During World War II it was the largest airport in southern China under Allied control, and in 1944 was a major battleground of Defense of Hengyang, a fierce battle fought between the Imperial Japanese Army and China's National Revolutionary Army.

After the war, Hengyang Airport briefly served civil flights in 1955.  It was expanded in 1986 and served commercial flights again between 1988 and 1995, but all flights ceased in November 1995.

See also
List of airports in China
List of the busiest airports in China

References

Airports in Hunan
Airports established in 1929
1929 establishments in China
Hengyang
Defunct airports in China
1995 disestablishments in China